"Jasmine's Beautiful Thoughts Underneath The Willow" is a poem from Wallace Stevens's first book of poetry, Harmonium. It was first published in 1923 and is therefore still under copyright. However, fair use in scholarly commentary justifies its being quoted here.

Interpretation
This is a love poem, or the closest approximation permitted by Stevens's sensibility and the indirection of his style, which renders his poems' semantics more or less opaque and often requires an unusually complex syntax. It may be compared to "Le Monocle de Mon Oncle", which can be understood to be about the travails of Stevens's marriage. If "Monocle" reflects on the difficulty of "transporting" love into middle age, "Jasmine's Beautiful Thoughts" muses on the eccentricity of his youthful love and may even suggest that it survives in some form, because of a strength like "an interior ocean's rocking", submerged beneath appearance.

1923 poems
American poems
Poetry by Wallace Stevens